Mike Patton is an American singer, best known for providing lead vocals for Faith No More along with Mr. Bungle, Fantômas, Peeping Tom, Tomahawk, Lovage and more. In addition to recording and working with these bands, he has also been involved in many side projects and collaborations. Patton is most frequently known as a vocalist, but has also produced, played various musical instruments, has composed soundtracks, done voice over work and has done some acting.

Patton's first recordings were demo tapes made while in high school as part of his band Mr. Bungle; the first, The Raging Wrath of the Easter Bunny was released in 1986. On the strength of these demo tapes, Patton was invited to sing vocals for rock band Faith No More. His first album for Faith No More, The Real Thing, was nominated for a Grammy Award and it contained the band's most successful single to date, "Epic".

Having gained fame with Faith No More, Mr. Bungle were signed to Warner Bros. Records. Their self-titled debut, although focusing on heavy metal, featured an eclectic mix of funk, free jazz, circus music and various other genres mixed with numerous samples, was released in 1991. The following year saw the release of Faith No More's next album, Angel Dust, the first Patton had musical influence on. It is Faith No More's most successful album to date and is widely considered to be the band's magnum opus.

In 1995, Patton released three albums—King for a Day... Fool for a Lifetime with Faith No More, which also saw the release of three singles; Disco Volante with Mr. Bungle; and Elegy with John Zorn, performing vocals all three. He has since released music under different projects and in a variety of different styles such as crooning, falsetto, death growls, rapping, chanting, mouth music, beatboxing and scatting, among others; leading critic Greg Prato call Patton "one of the most versatile and talented singers in rock music".

On April 1, 1999, Patton co-founded the independent record label Ipecac Recordings with Greg Werckman. He has released most of his subsequent output on that label. His directorial debut was in 1993, with an abstract film titled Video Macumba. His first solo album, Adult Themes for Voice, was released in 1996. His first role as actor was in the 2004 film Firecracker. He has released 32 studio albums, 1 EPs, 2 live albums, 15 video albums, composed 4 soundtracks and has made more than 60 other appearances, providing vocals for single tracks. He has worked with such artists as Sepultura, Dan the Automator, John Zorn, The Dillinger Escape Plan, The X-Ecutioners, Merzbow, John Kaada, The Melvins, Dub Trio, Björk, Zu and many more.

Faith No More

Studio albums

Live albums

Singles

Music videos

Compilations

Other appearances

Videography

Mr. Bungle

Studio albums

Live albums

Single

Music videos

Demos

Compilations/Other

Fantômas

Studio albums

Live albums

Split albums

Box set

Videography

Other appearances

Tomahawk

Studio albums

Singles

Box set

Music videos

tētēma

Studio albums

Peeping Tom

Studio albums

Singles

Music video

Dead Cross

Studio albums

Music videos

Other appearances

With John Zorn

Studio albums

Hemophiliac

Moonchild Trio

Other

Solo

Studio albums

Film scores

Collaborations

Albums

Videography

Music videos

Filmography

As a musician

As talent

As composer
These releases are Patton's work solely as composer. Soundtracks featuring Patton as a part of other bands are listed in those bands' respective categories.

Video games

Other appearances

Notes

References

External links

Ipecac Recordings
Faith No More - Official website
Mr. Bungle - Official website
Mike Patton Discography on Patton Fanatic

Discographies of American artists
Rock music discographies